D58 is a state road in the central Dalmatia region of Croatia that provides access from the A1 motorway's Vrpolje interchange to the D8 state road, facilitating access from A1 motorway to Šibenik, Trogir and surrounding seaside resorts.

The western terminus of the road is located in Šibenik port, near an interchange to the D8 state road. At its eastern terminus, the road connects once more to the D8 state road which serves as a parallel road to the D8 between Šibenik and Trogir, connecting to Rogoznica and Primošten.

The road, as well as all other state roads in Croatia, is managed and maintained by Hrvatske ceste, a state-owned company.

Traffic volume 

Traffic is regularly counted and reported by Hrvatske ceste, operator of the road. Substantial variations between annual (AADT) and summer (ASDT) traffic volumes are attributed to the fact that the road serves as a D8 bypass, especially during summer season congestions.

Road junctions

Sources

D058
D058
D058